Frankie Wells may refer to:

Frankie Wells, fictional character in Blessed Event
Frankie Wells, fictional character in List of Person of Interest episodes

See also
Frank Wells (disambiguation)